or  is a lake that is located on the border of Norway and Sweden, about  southeast of the town of Narvik. The Norwegian side lies in Narvik Municipality in Nordland county and the Swedish side lies in Gällivare Municipality in Norrbotten County.  The  lake has a dam on the northern end and the water is used for hydropower.  After the dam was built, the lake grew and merged with the lake Vannaksvatnet to the south.  The lake Unna Guovdelisjávri lies just to the east of this lake.

See also
List of lakes in Norway

References

Narvik
Lakes of Nordland
Norway–Sweden border
International lakes of Europe
Reservoirs in Norway
Lakes of Norrbotten County